Viktoriya Dimitrova (born 12 October 1979) is a Bulgarian rower. She competed in the women's lightweight double sculls event at the 2000 Summer Olympics.

References

External links
 

1979 births
Living people
Bulgarian female rowers
Olympic rowers of Bulgaria
Rowers at the 2000 Summer Olympics
Sportspeople from Varna, Bulgaria